Campolongo may refer to a neighbourhood in Spain:
Campolongo, in the city of Pontevedra, Province of Pontevedra (PO), Galicia

Campolongo may refer to several places in Italy:

Municipalities (comuni)
Campolongo Maggiore, in the Province of Venice, Veneto
Campolongo Minore, old name of Campodoro, in the Province of Padua, Veneto
Campolongo sul Brenta, in the Province of Vicenza, Veneto
Campolongo Tapogliano, in the Province of Udine, Friuli-Venezia Giulia

Civil parishes (frazioni)
Campolongo (Conegliano), in the municipality of Conegliano (TV), Veneto
Campolongo (Eboli), in the municipality of Eboli (SA), Campania
Campolongo (Fossalta di Piave), in the municipality of Fossalta di Piave (VE), Veneto
 Campolongo (Isola di Capo Rizzuto), in the municipality of Isola di Capo Rizzuto (KR), Calabria
Campolongo (San Germano dei Berici), in the municipality of San Germano dei Berici (VI), Veneto
Campolongo (Santo Stefano di Cadore), in the municipality of Santo Stefano di Cadore (BL), Veneto
Campolongo al Torre, in the municipality of Campolongo Tapogliano (UD), Friuli-Venezia Giulia

Mountains
Campolongo Pass, a mountain pass of the Dolomites in Trentino-South Tyrol

People
Alberto Campolongo (1912-unknown), Italian chess master